Nurmat Mirzabaev (born 11 November 1972) is a retired football defender from Kazakhstan. He obtained a total number of sixteen caps for the Kazakhstan national football team during his career, scoring one goal.

References 

playerhistory

1972 births
Living people
Kazakhstani footballers
Kazakhstan international footballers
Association football defenders
FC Taraz players
FC Irtysh Pavlodar players
FC Kyzylzhar players
FC Aktobe players
Kazakhstan Premier League players
Footballers at the 1998 Asian Games
FC Taraz managers
Asian Games competitors for Kazakhstan
Kazakhstani football managers